Samuel Vestey, 2nd Baron Vestey (25 December 1882 – 4 May 1954) was a British noble.

Early life
He was the son of William Vestey, 1st Baron Vestey, and was educated at Merton College, Oxford, matriculating in 1901.

He served as Sheriff of Gloucestershire in 1933.

He succeeded to the title on his father's death in 1940.

Career
He was a Justice of the Peace, and photographs of him by Lafayette are in the collection of the National Portrait Gallery.

Personal life
In 1908, he married Frances Sarah Howarth, and they had three children:
Hon. Kathleen Sarah Vestey (born in May 1909), married Captain Maurice John Kingscote (b. 30 Jul 1887, d. 5 Jun 1959) on 18 September 1936.
Captain Hon. William Howarth Vestey (1912–1944)
Hon. Joan Frances Vestey (1914–1991)

On his death in 1954, he was succeeded by his grandson, Samuel Vestey, 3rd Baron Vestey, who was the son of the Hon. Captain William Vestey who was killed in action in Italy in 1944.

References

1882 births
1954 deaths
Barons in the Peerage of the United Kingdom
Samuel
Alumni of Merton College, Oxford